Qusay Salahaddin was as Sunni Arab student in Mosul.  Salahaddin was the head of the student union of the University of Mosul. Salahuddin led protests vs the accused frauds in the December 2005 parliamentary votes. Gunmen abducted Salahaddin on December 22, 2005. His body was found the following Sunday, December 25, 2005.

People from Mosul

References 

2005 deaths